The following is a list of charter schools in Illinois (including networks of such schools) grouped by city.

Chicago

 Academy for Global Citizenship
 ACE Amandla Charter School
 Acero Charter School Network
 Bartolome de las Casas
 Brighton Park
 Carlos Fuentes
 Esmaralda Santiago
 Jovita Idar
 Major Hector P. Garcia
 Octavio Paz
 Officer Donald J. Marquez
 PFC Omar E. Torres
 Roberto Clemente
 Rufino Tamayo
 Sandra Cisneros
 Sor Juana Ines de la Cruz
 SPC Daniel Zizumbo
 Victoria Soto
 Art in Motion AIM Charter School
 Asian Human Services-Passages Charter School
 ASPIRA Charter Schools (Business and Finance, Early College Prep, Haugan)
 Barbara A. Sizemore Academy
 Betty Shabazz International Charter School
 Bronzeville Academy Charter School
 The Catalyst Schools (Circle Rock, Maria)
 Chicago Math and Science Academy
 Chicago Collegiate Charter School
 Chicago International Charter School
 Avalon 
 Basi
 Bucktown
 ChicagoQuest
 Irving Park
 Lloyd Bond
 Longwood
 Loomis Primary
 Northtown Academy
 Prairie
 Ralph Ellison
 Washington Park
 West Belden
 Wrightwood
 Christopher House Charter Elementary School
 EPIC Academy Charter High School
 Erie Charter Elementary School
 Great Lakes Academy Charter Elementary School
 Horizon Science Academy (Belmont, McKinley Park, Southwest)
 Instituto Health Sciences Career Charter Academy
 Instituto Leadership & Justice Academy Charter High School
 Intrinsic Charter School
 KIPP Chicago (Ascend, Bloom, Create, KIPP One)
 Learn Charter Schools (7th, Butler, Campbell, Excel, Hunter Perkins, Middle, South Chicago)
 Legacy Charter Elementary School
 LEGAL Prep Charter Academy
 Locke A Charter School
 Montessori Charter School Englewood
 Moving Everest Charter School
 Namaste Charter School
 Noble Network of Charter Schools
 Baker College Prep
 Butler College Preparatory High School
 Chicago Bulls College Prep
 DRW College Prep
 Gary Comer College Prep
 Golder College Prep
 Hansberry College Prep
 ITW David Speer Academy
 Johnson College Prep
 Mansueto High School
 Muchin College Prep
 Noble Academy
 Noble Street College Prep
 Pritzker College Prep
 Rauner College Prep
 Rowe-Clark Math & Science Academy
 UIC College Prep
 North Lawndale College Prep High School
 Perspectives Charter Schools (HS of Technology, IIT, Joslin, Leadership, Middle)
 Polaris Charter Academy
 Providence-Englewood Elementary Charter School
 Rowe Elementary School
 University of Chicago Charter School (Donoghue, North Kenwood, Woodlawn)
 Urban Prep Academies (Bronzeville, Englewood, West)
 Youth Connections Charter High Schools
 Ada S. McKinley Lakeside
 ASA – Community Services West
 Antonia Pantoja – Aspira
 Austin Career Education Center
 CCA – Community Services West
 Chatham Academy 
 Charles Houston 
 Community Youth Development Institute
 Dr. Pedro Albizu Campos High School
 El Cuarto Año – Association House
 Howard Area Alternative
 Innovations High School
 Jane Addams High School
 Latino Youth High School – Pilsen Wellness Center
 Olive – Harvey Middle College
 Options Laboratory School
 Sullivan House
 Truman Middle College
 Westside Holistic Leadership Academy
 West Town Academy
 YCCS Virtual High School / Stride, Inc. at Malcolm X College
 Youth Connection Leadership Academy

Decatur
 Robertson Charter School

East St. Louis
 SIU Charter School of East St. Louis

Elgin
 Elgin Math & Science Academy Charter School

Grayslake
 Prairie Crossing Charter School

Great Lakes

 LEARN 6 Charter School
 LEARN 10 Charter School

Normal
 YBMC Charter School

Peoria
 Quest Charter School Academy

Pingree Grove
 Cambridge Lakes Charter School

Richton Park
 Southland College Preparatory Charter High School

Rockford

 Galapagos Rockford Charter School
 Jackson Charter School
 Legacy Academy of Excellence Charter School

Springfield
 Springfield Ball Charter School

Waukegan
 LEARN 9 Charter School

References

School districts
School districts